Club Deportivo Fuengirola was a football club based in Fuengirola, Andalusia. The club came to play 3 seasons in Segunda División B. Club Deportivo Fuengirola disappears in 1992.

In 1992, CD Fuengirola, CA Fuengirola and AD Balompédica Fuengirola merge into UD Fuengirola. In 2001, UD Fuengirola and CD Los Boliches merge into UD Fuengirola Los Boliches.

Club background
Club Deportivo Fuengirola - (1931–1992) → ↓
Club Atlético Fuengirola - (1982–1992) → ↓
Unión Deportiva Fuengirola - (1992–2001) → ↓
Asociación Deportiva Balompédica Fuengirola - (1984–1992) → ↑
Unión Deportiva Fuengirola Los Boliches - (2001–present)
Club Deportivo Los Boliches - (1973–2001) → ↑

Season to season

3 seasons in Segunda División B
12 seasons in Tercera División

 
Defunct football clubs in Andalusia
Association football clubs established in 1931
Association football clubs disestablished in 1992
1931 establishments in Spain
1992 disestablishments in Spain
Fuengirola